Allestree  is a small town in Victoria, Australia. It is located along the Princes Highway, north-east of Portland.  At the 2016 Census, Allestree and the surrounding area recorded a population of 128.

Allestree is named after Allestree in Derbyshire, England. 
Allestree Post Office opened on 9 August 1907 (replacing nearby Bolwarra) and closed in 1971.

Within the locality of Allestree is the Convincing Ground where a massacre of aborigines is alleged to have taken place in around 1833.

The beaches in Allestree have experienced substantial erosion problems since the port breakwater was lengthened many years ago.  The shoreline has receded several hundreds of metres and significant coastal property and infrastructure has been lost.

Glenelg Shire Council hosted the world-renowned oceanographer Dr Kerry Black in 2017 as part of a forum to discuss coastal management trends and issues with representatives from across south-west Victoria and south-east South Australia. The one-hour session focused on global strategies to protect beaches from erosion, including a detailed focus on regenerating the beaches along Dutton Way and the Port of Portland. Local residents are hopeful that the Glenelg Shire will help implement Dr Black's recommendations to restore and protect the region's coastlines from the growing threat of climate change.

Traditional ownership
The formally recognised traditional owners for the area in which Allestree sits are the Gunditjmara people. The Gunditjmara people are represented by the Gunditj Mirring Traditional Owners Aboriginal Corporation.

Demographics
As of the 2016 census, 322 people resided in Allestree. The median age of persons in Allestree was 45 years. Children aged 0–14 years made up 18.4% of the population.  People over the age of 65 years made up 14.4% of the population.  There were slightly more males than females with 52.2% of the population male and 47.8% female.  The average household size is 2.3 people per household.  The average number of children per family for families with children is 1.7.

92.4% of people in Allestree were born in Australia.  Of all persons living in Dartmoor, 2.4% (3 persons) were Aboriginal and/or Torres Strait Islander people.  This is higher than for the state of Victoria (0.8%) and lower than the national average (2.8%).

Gallery

References

Coastal towns in Victoria (Australia)
Towns in Victoria (Australia)